Eois dissimilaris is a species of moth in the Geometridae family.

References 

dissimilaris
Moths described in 1887